The 2021 Trofeo Alfredo Binda-Comune di Cittiglio was the 45th running of the Trofeo Alfredo Binda, a women's cycling race in Italy. It was the second event of the 2021 UCI Women's World Tour season and was held on 21 March 2021. The race started in Cocquio-Trevisago and finished in Cittiglio, on the outskirts of Lago Maggiore in Northwest Italy. The event was cancelled in 2020 due to the COVID-19 pandemic.

Teams
22 teams competed in the race.

UCI Women's WorldTeams

 
 
 
 
 
 
 
 
 

UCI Women's Continental Teams

Result

See also
2021 in women's road cycling

References

External links

2021 in Italian sport
2021
2021 UCI Women's World Tour
Trofeo Alfredo Binda-Comune di Cittiglio